Mick Wall (born 23 June 1958) is a British music journalist, author, and radio and TV presenter. He has been described as "the world's leading rock and metal writer".

Career
Wall began his career contributing to the music weekly Sounds in 1977, where he wrote about punk and the new wave, and then  rockabilly, funk, New Romantic pop and, eventually, hard rock and heavy metal. In 1979, he left music journalism to become the partner in his own PR firm, Heavy Publicity, aged 20, where he oversaw press campaigns for artists such as Black Sabbath, Journey, REO Speedwagon, Thin Lizzy, Ultravox, The Damned, Dire Straits and several others. In the early 1980s he also worked at Virgin Records as press officer for such artists as Gillan, The Human League, Simple Minds, Japan and others.

By 1983, Wall become one of the main journalists in the early days of Kerrang! magazine, where he was their star cover story writer for the next nine years. He subsequently became the founding editor of Classic Rock magazine in 1998, and presented his own television and radio shows on Sky TV (Monsters of Rock), Capital Radio, BBC GLR, BBC Radio 1, Planet Rock and others. He has also guested on several television programmes and documentaries on BBC TV, ITV, Sky One, Channel Four and MTV.

Wall has written many biographies of musicians and bands including Ozzy Osbourne, Iron Maiden, AC/DC, Metallica and Guns N' Roses. The latter mentioned him in their song "Get in the Ring" after Wall fell out with his former friend, singer Axl Rose. In April 2016, Wall
made an impassioned apology to Rose, acknowledging that the spirit of the book he had written on Axl Rose ten years earlier was "mean, disgruntled, unworthy. I’m sorry I wrote it." He concluded by saying, "I can’t wait to see what Axl Rose and Guns N’ Roses do next. They are the last of the giants and I am a fan."

His book Paranoid: Black Days With Sabbath & Other Horror Stories (1999) is a semi-fictionalised account of his substance-abusing days in the 1980s working with some of the biggest rock stars in the world. In 2008, he wrote a biography of Led Zeppelin entitled When Giants Walked the Earth.

Wall was also the author of a blog on his official website, consisting of a compendium of domestic affairs and anecdotes from his past (2006-2014). He deleted his website in 2020. "I was sooo bored with it and nobody looks at websites anymore anyway," he said. Instead he now has his Official Facebook page, his personal Facebook page, the Dead Rock Stars FB page and his twitter account. He also co-hosted a podcast called "Dead Rock Stars" with fellow writer Joel McIver, which ran for 23 episodes in 2018. In June 2018, The Guardian named "Dead Rock Stars" their podcast of the week. In 2020, Wall teamed up with podcast network, NoFilter Media, to launch "Getcha Rocks Off" podcast.
His book, Two Riders Were Approaching: The Life & Death of Jimi Hendrix (Trapeze) is his most controversial, opening as it does on the first page an imagined account of the murder of Hendrix. The book is written in a novelistic style which Classic Rock said "does for Hendrix what James Ellroy did for the story of JF Kennedy, another murdered rock star."

Bibliography

Diary Of A Madman – The Official Biography of Ozzy Osbourne, Zomba Books, 1986
Market Square Heroes – The Authorized Biography of Marillion, Sidgwick & Jackson, 1987
Guns N’ Roses: The Most Dangerous Band In The World, Sidgwick & Jackson, 1991
Pearl Jam, Sidgwick & Jackson, 1994
All Night Long: The True Story of Jon Bon Jovi, Omnibus Press, 1995
Run To The Hills: The Authorised Biography of Iron Maiden, Sanctuary Books, 1998
Paranoid: Black Days With Sabbath & Other Horror Stories. Mainstream, 1999
Mr Big: Ozzy, Sharon and My Life as the Godfather of Rock, Robson Books, 2004 (written with Don Arden)
XS All Areas: the Autobiography of Status Quo, Sidgwick & Jackson, 2004 (written with Francis Rossi and Rick Parfitt)
John Peel – A Tribute To The Legendary DJ and Broadcaster, Orion Books, 2004
Bono: In The Name Of Love, Andre Deutsch, 2005
Star Trippin’: The Best Of Mick Wall 1985–91, M&G, 2006
W. Axl Rose: The Unauthorised Biography, Sidgwick & Jackson, 2007
When Giants Walked the Earth: A Biography of Led Zeppelin, Orion Books, 2008
Osbournes Confidential: An Insider's Chronicle, JR Books, 2008
Appetite For Destruction: Legendary Encounters With Mick Wall, Orion Books, 2010
Enter Night – Metallica: The Biography, Orion Books, 2010
AC/DC – Hell Ain’t A Bad Place To Be, Orion Books, 2012
Black Sabbath: Symptom of the Universe, Orion Books, 2013
Lou Reed: The Life, Orion Books, 2013
Love Becomes A Funeral Pyre: The Biography of The Doors, Orion Books, 2014
Black Sabbath: Symptom of the Universe St. Martin's Press, 2015
Getcha Rock's Off: Sex & Excess. Bust Up's & Binges. Life & Death on the Rock N' Roll Road, Orion Books, 2015
Foo Fighters : Learning to Fly, Orion Books, 2015  
Lemmy : The Definitive Biography, Orion Books, 2016
Last of the Giants: The True Story of Guns N' Roses, Trapeze, 2016
Like a Bat Out of Hell: The Larger than Life story of Meat Loaf,  Trapeze, 2017
Steven Wilson: Limited Edition of One: How to Succeed in the Music Industry Without Being Part of the Mainstream, Constable Books, 2022

References

External links
 Official Website

British music journalists
Living people
British writers
1958 births